Herman Ralph Wehmeier (February 18, 1927 – May 21, 1973) was an American professional baseball player, a right-handed pitcher for the Cincinnati Reds (1945 and 1947–54), Philadelphia Phillies (1954–56), St. Louis Cardinals (1956–58) and Detroit Tigers (1958). He was born in Cincinnati, and died in Dallas, Texas due to a heart attack, at the age of 46, while he was testifying in an embezzlement trial.

Wehmeier attended Western Hills High School (Cincinnati, Ohio). Signed by the Cincinnati Reds out of high school, he went on to play 16 years in the major leagues.

He led the National League in Walks Allowed in 1949 (117), 1950 (135) and 1952 (103).  He led the NL in Earned Runs Allowed (145) in 1950.  He led the NL in Wild Pitches in 1949 (7) and 1950 (11).  He led the NL in Hit Batsmen (7) in 1952.  In 13 seasons he had a 92–108 Win–loss record, 240 Games Started, 79 Complete Games, 9 Shutouts, 9 Saves, 1,803 Innings Pitched, 794 Strikeouts, and a 4.80 ERA. As a hitter, he posted a .196 batting average (124-for-633) with 67 runs, 3 home runs and 40 RBIs.

References

External links

 

1927 births
1973 deaths
Baseball players from Cincinnati
Cincinnati Redlegs players
Cincinnati Reds players
Cincinnati Reds scouts
Columbia Reds players
Detroit Tigers players
Major League Baseball pitchers
Philadelphia Phillies players
St. Louis Cardinals players
Syracuse Chiefs players